is a Japanese manga artist known for the series Miss Kobayashi's Dragon Maid, I Can't Understand What My Husband Is Saying, and Komori-san Can't Decline.

History
In 2011, Coolkyousinnjya published the first volume of I Can't Understand What My Husband Is Saying. An anime adaptation aired from October to December 2014, with a second season airing from April to June 2015.

In April 2012, Coolkyousinnjya released the first chapter of Komori-san Can't Decline. An anime adaptation aired from October to December 2015.

On 10 May 2014, the first Miss Kobayashi's Dragon Maid chapter was published in Japanese, and the first English volume was published on 18 October 2016. As of December 2021, 11 manga volumes have been published. Miss Kobayashi's Dragon Maid also has four spin-off series, including Miss Kobayashi's Dragon Maid: Kanna's Daily Life and Miss Kobayashi's Dragon Maid: Elma's Office Lady Diary. Miss Kobayashi's Dragon Maid has over 1.2 million copies in print worldwide as of February 2018. It received an anime adaptation in early 2017, with a second season airing in 2021.

Coolkyousinnjya is also writing Peach Boy Riverside and illustrating The Idaten Deities Know Only Peace, which both had anime adaptations premiere in July 2021.

References

External links
 

Manga artists
Year of birth missing (living people)
Living people
Pseudonymous writers